James Inglebright (born November 18, 1961) is an American professional stock car racing driver. He is a longtime competitor in the NASCAR West Series (now the ARCA Menards Series West).

Racing career

Inglebright began his racing career driving motocross, however after seven knee operations he switched to stock car racing.

Inglebright ran 99 races in the NASCAR AutoZone Elite Division, Southwest Series. After much success in the series, Inglebright won eight races and amassed 62 top ten finishes. In the 1995 NASCAR Featherlite Southwest Series, Inglebright was a runner-up. He was the 11th NFSWS driver to surpass $100,000 from his career winnings.

Inglebright then moved up to the NASCAR West Series, winning one race and finishing in the top ten eleven times. Although he was once a full-season competitor, he currently races in only the Sonoma race each year in his own No. 1 car.

Inglebright's run at Sonoma in 2019 came for Jefferson Pitts Racing, with him continuing to use the No. 1 from his family team, but in a Ford Fusion instead of a Chevrolet.

Inglebright has also raced in the top three divisions of NASCAR, including as a road course ringer in the NASCAR Cup Series race at Sonoma Raceway for three straight years. In Cup, he has two starts in three attempts (all at Sonoma), with a 32nd-place finish in 2002 in his family team's No. 0 car, and a 19th-place finish in 2004 in the Richard Childress Racing No. 30. In the Craftsman Truck Series, Inglebright ran 17 races from 2000 and 2001 (with one DNQ in 2002 as well) scoring a top ten at California Speedway.

Motorsports career results

NASCAR
(key) (Bold – Pole position awarded by qualifying time. Italics – Pole position earned by points standings or practice time. * – Most laps led.)

Nextel Cup Series

Craftsman Truck Series

Busch East Series

K&N Pro Series West

References

External links
 

1961 births
Living people
NASCAR drivers
People from Fairfield, California
People from Solano County, California
Racing drivers from California
Sportspeople from the San Francisco Bay Area
Richard Childress Racing drivers